Serpent Nunatak is a nunatak which is seen in the shape of a reverse letter S, rising to about  just west of Tufts Pass lying within the Nichols Snowfield, in the northern portion of Alexander Island, Antarctica. The feature was descriptively named by United Kingdom Antarctic Place-Names Committee in 1977 because of the nunataks shape, the reverse letter S supposedly resembles a Serpent.

See also

 Geode Nunataks
 Stephenson Nunatak
 Titan Nunatak

Nunataks of Alexander Island